James C. Terrell (November 7, 1806 – December 1, 1835) was a United States Representative and lawyer from Georgia.

Terrell was born in Franklin County, Georgia, in 1806. He attended studied law, gained admittance to the state bar and practiced law in Carnesville, Georgia. He served in the Georgia House of Representatives from 1830 to 1834. He was elected as a Union Representative from Georgia to the 24th United States Congress  and served from March 4, 1835, until his resignation on July 8, 1835, due to failing health. He died later that year on December 1, 1835.

References

1806 births
1835 deaths
Members of the Georgia House of Representatives
Members of the United States House of Representatives from Georgia (U.S. state)
Georgia (U.S. state) lawyers
People from Carnesville, Georgia
19th-century American politicians
American slave owners
19th-century American lawyers